Rich Knob, elevation 4,152 feet, is located in Towns County, Georgia.  It is part of the Georgia portion of the Southern Nantahala Wilderness and is within the boundaries of the Tallulah Ranger District of the Chattahoochee National Forest. The mountain lies along the Appalachian Trail, which crosses over its eastern flank in Rabun County as it enters North Carolina. Rich Knob also is along the route of The Mountains-To-Sea Trail, East of Rattlesnake Lodge.

References 
Georgia's Named Summits
100 highest peaks in Georgia
Georgia peaks over 4,000 feet

External links 
Topographical map of Rich Knob

Mountains of Georgia (U.S. state)
Mountains of Towns County, Georgia
Chattahoochee-Oconee National Forest